Common chicory (Cichorium intybus) is a somewhat woody, perennial herbaceous plant of the family Asteraceae, usually with bright blue flowers, rarely white or pink. Native to the Old World, it has been introduced to the Americas and Australia. Many varieties are cultivated for salad leaves, chicons (blanched buds), or roots (var. sativum), which are baked, ground, and used as a coffee substitute and food additive. In the 21st century, inulin, an extract from chicory root, has been used in food manufacturing as a sweetener and source of dietary fiber.

Chicory is grown as a forage crop for livestock. "Chicory" is also the common name in the United States for curly endive (Cichorium endivia); these two closely related species are often confused.

Description
When flowering, chicory has a tough, grooved, and more or less hairy stem. Of the two rows of involucral bracts, the inner is longer and erect, the outer is shorter and spreading. It flowers from March until October. The seed has small scales at the tip.

Chemistry 
Substances which contribute to the plant's bitterness are primarily the two sesquiterpene lactones, lactucin and lactucopicrin. Other components are aesculetin, aesculin, cichoriin, umbelliferone, scopoletin, 6,7-dihydrocoumarin, and further sesquiterpene lactones and their glycosides. Around 1970, it was discovered that the root contains up to 20% inulin, a polysaccharide similar to starch.

Names 
Common chicory is also known as blue daisy, blue dandelion, blue sailors, blue weed, bunk, coffeeweed, cornflower, hendibeh, horseweed, ragged sailors, succory, wild bachelor's buttons, and wild endive. (Note: "cornflower" is commonly applied to Centaurea cyanus.) Common names for varieties of var. foliosum include endive, radicchio, radichetta, Belgian endive, French endive, red endive, sugarloaf, and witloof (or witlof).

Distribution and habitat 
Chicory is native to western Asia, North Africa, and Europe. It lives as a wild plant on roadsides in Europe. The plant was brought to North America by early European colonists. It is also common in China, and Australia, where it has become widely naturalized. It thrives in areas with abundant rain.

Uses

Culinary 

The entire plant is edible.

Raw chicory leaves are 92% water, 5% carbohydrates, 2% protein, and contain negligible fat (table). In a 100 gram (3½ oz) reference amount, raw chicory leaves provide  and significant amounts (more than 20% of the Daily Value) of vitamin K, vitamin A, vitamin C, some B vitamins, and manganese. Vitamin E and calcium are present in moderate amounts. Raw endive is 94% water and has low nutrient content.

Root chicory 
Root chicory (Cichorium intybus var. sativum) has long been cultivated in Europe as a coffee substitute. The roots are baked, roasted, ground, and used as an additive, especially in the Mediterranean region (where the plant is native). As a coffee additive, it is also mixed in Indian filter coffee, and in parts of Southeast Asia, South Africa, and the southern United States, particularly in New Orleans. In France a mixture of 60% chicory and 40% coffee is sold under the trade name Ricoré. It has been more widely used during economic crises such as the Great Depression in the 1930s and during World War II in Continental Europe. Chicory, with sugar beet and rye, was used as an ingredient of the East German Mischkaffee (mixed coffee), introduced during the "East German coffee crisis" of 1976–79. It is also added to coffee in Spanish, Greek, Turkish, Syrian, Lebanese and Palestinian cuisines.

Some beer brewers use roasted chicory to add flavor to stouts (commonly expected to have a coffee-like flavor). Others have added it to strong blond Belgian-style ales, to augment the hops, making a witloofbier, from the Dutch name for the plant.

The roots can also be cooked like parsnips.

Leaf chicory

Wild 
While edible raw, wild chicory leaves usually have a bitter taste, especially the older leaves. The flavor is appreciated in certain cuisines, such as in the Ligurian and Apulian regions of Italy and also in the southern part of India. In Ligurian cuisine, wild chicory leaves are an ingredient of preboggion and in the Apulian region, wild chicory leaves are combined with fava bean puree in the traditional local dish fave e cicorie selvatiche. In Albania, the leaves are used as a spinach substitute, mainly served simmered and marinated in olive oil, or as ingredient for fillings of byrek. In Greece a variety of wild chicory found in Crete and known as stamnagathi (spiny chicory) is used as a salad served with olive oil and lemon juice.

By cooking and discarding the water, the bitterness is reduced, after which the chicory leaves may be sautéed with garlic, anchovies, and other ingredients. In this form, the resulting greens might be combined with pasta or accompany meat dishes.

Cultivated 
Chicory may be cultivated for its leaves, usually eaten raw as salad leaves. Cultivated chicory is generally divided into three types, of which there are many varieties:

 Radicchio usually has variegated red or red and green leaves. Some only refer to the white-veined red-leaved type as radicchio, also known as red endive and red chicory. It has a bitter and spicy taste, which mellows when it is grilled or roasted. It can also be used to add color and zest to salads. It is largely used in Italy in different varieties, the most famous being the ones from Treviso (known as radicchio rosso di Treviso), from Verona (radicchio di Verona), and Chioggia (radicchio di Chioggia), which are classified as an IGP. It is also common in Greece, where it is known as radiki and mainly boiled in salads, and is used in pies.

Belgian endive is known in Dutch as witloof or witlof ("white leaf"), indivia in Italy, endivias in Spain, chicory in the UK, as witlof in Australia, endive in France and Canada, and chicon in parts of northern France, in Wallonia and (in French) in Luxembourg. It has a small head of cream-colored, bitter leaves. The harvested root is allowed to sprout indoors in the absence of sunlight, which prevents the leaves from turning green and opening up (etiolation). It is often sold wrapped in blue paper to protect it from light, so to preserve its pale color and delicate flavor. The smooth, creamy white leaves may be served stuffed, baked, boiled, cut and cooked in a milk sauce, or simply cut raw. The tender leaves are slightly bitter; the whiter the leaf, the less bitter the taste. The harder inner part of the stem at the bottom of the head can be cut out before cooking to prevent bitterness. Belgium exports chicon/witloof to over 40 countries. The technique for growing blanched endives was accidentally discovered in the 1850s at the Botanical Garden of Brussels in Saint-Josse-ten-Noode, Belgium. Today France is the largest producer of endive.

Catalogna chicory (Cichorium intybus var. foliosum), also known as puntarelle, includes a whole subfamily (some varieties from Belgian endive and some from radicchio) of chicory and is used throughout Italy.

Although leaf chicory is often called "endive", true endive (Cichorium endivia) is a different species in the genus, distinct from Belgian endive.

Chicory root and inulin 
Inulin is mainly found in the plant family Asteraceae as a storage carbohydrate (for example Jerusalem artichoke, dahlia, yacon, etc.). It is used as a sweetener in the food industry with a sweetening power 10% that of sucrose and is sometimes added to yogurts as a 'prebiotic'.

Fresh chicory root may contain between 13 and 23% inulin, by total weight.

Medicinal use 
Chicory root contains essential oils similar to those found in plants in the related genus Tanacetum. In alternative medicine, chicory has been listed as one of the 38 plants used to prepare Bach flower remedies.

Forage 
Chicory is highly digestible for ruminants and has a low fiber concentration. Chicory roots were once considered an "excellent substitute for oats" for horses due to their protein and fat content. Chicory contains a low quantity of reduced tannins that may increase protein utilization efficiency in ruminants.

Some tannins reduce intestinal parasites. Dietary chicory may be toxic to internal parasites, with studies of ingesting chicory by farm animals having lower worm burdens, leading to its use as a forage supplement. Although chicory might have originated in France, Italy and India, much development of chicory for use with livestock has been undertaken in New Zealand.

Forage chicory varieties 
 'Puna' ('Grasslands Puna'): Developed in New Zealand, Grasslands Puna is well adapted to different climates, being grown from Alberta, Canada, New Mexico, Florida to Australia. It is resistant to bolting, which leads to high nutrient levels in the leaves in spring. It also is able to quickly come back after grazing.

 'Forage Feast': A variety from France used for human consumption and also for wildlife plots, where animals such as deer might graze. It is resistant to bolting. It is very cold-hardy, and being lower in tannins than other forage varieties, is suitable for human consumption.
 'Choice': has been bred for high winter and early-spring growth activity, and lower amounts of lactucin and lactone, which are believed to taint milk. It is also use for seeding deer wildlife plots.
 'Oasis': was bred for increased lactone rates for the forage industry, and for higher resistance to fungal diseases such as Sclerotinia (mainly s. minor and S. sclerotiorum.)
 'Puna II': This variety is more winter-active than most others, which leads to greater persistence and longevity.
 'Grouse': A New Zealand variety, it is used as a planting companion for forage brassicas. More prone to early flowering than other varieties, it has higher crowns more susceptible to overbrowsing.
 'Six Point': A United States variety, winter hardy and resistant to bolting. It is very similar to Puna.

Others varieties known include; 'Chico', 'Ceres Grouse', 'Good Hunt', 'El Nino' and 'Lacerta'.

History 
The plant has a history reaching back to ancient Egypt. In ancient Rome, a dish called puntarelle was made with chicory sprouts.  It was mentioned by Horace in reference to his own diet, which he describes as very simple: "Me pascunt olivae, me cichorea, me malvae" ("As for me, olives, endives, and mallows provide sustenance"). Chicory was first described as a cultivated plant in the 17th century. When coffee was introduced to Europe, the Dutch thought that chicory made a lively addition to the bean drink.

In 1766, Frederick the Great banned the importation of coffee into Prussia, leading to the development of a coffee substitute by Brunswick innkeeper Christian Gottlieb Förster (died 1801), who gained a concession in 1769–70 to manufacture it in Brunswick and Berlin. By 1795, 22 to 24 factories of this type were in Brunswick. Lord Monboddo describes the plant in 1779 as the "chicoree", which the French cultivated as a pot herb. In Napoleonic Era France, chicory frequently appeared as an adulterant in coffee, or as a coffee substitute. Chicory was also adopted as a coffee substitute by Confederate soldiers during the American Civil War, and has become common in the United States. It was also used in the United Kingdom during the Second World War, where Camp Coffee, a coffee and chicory essence, has been on sale since 1885.

In the U.S., chicory root has long been used as a coffee substitute in prisons. By the 1840s, the port of New Orleans was the second-largest importer of coffee (after New York). Louisianans began to add chicory root to their coffee when Union naval blockades during the American Civil War cut off the port of New Orleans, thereby creating a long-standing tradition.

Culture 
Chicory is mentioned in certain ancient Chinese texts about silk production. Amongst traditional recommendations the primary caretaker of the silkworms, the "silkworm mother", should not eat or even touch it.

The chicory flower is often seen as inspiration for the Romantic concept of the Blue Flower (e.g. in German language Blauwarte ≈ blue lookout by the wayside). Similar to the springwort and moonwort, it could open locked doors, according to European folklore. However, the plant must be gathered at noon or midnight on St. James's Day and cut with gold while being silent, or else one would die afterwards. 

Chicory was also believed to grant its possessor invisibility.

Gallery

See also
 Sugar substitute

References

External links

ITIS 36762
Species of chicory and endive
Edibility of Chicory: Edible parts and identification of wild Chicory.
Chicory, from Nature Manitoba

Cichorieae
Coffee substitutes
Crops
Dietary supplements
Flora of Europe
Food additives
Leaf vegetables
Medicinal plants
Perennial vegetables
Plants described in 1753
Prebiotics (nutrition)
Spices